Inger Nordal (born 11 August 1944) is a Norwegian professor of botany.

She was an associate professor at the University of Oslo from 1974, took the fil.dr. degree (doctorate) at Uppsala University in 1977 and became a professor in 1987. In 1990 she was admitted into the Norwegian Academy of Science and Letters. A few of her early papers were published under her then married name "Inger Nordal Bjørnstad".

Nordal was also elected as a member of Bærum municipal council for the term 1979–1983, representing the Socialist Left Party. She resides at Østerås.

Authority names
Nordal is known historically in the scientific literature under two different reference names, the latter Nordal being the current form.

References

1944 births
Living people
20th-century Norwegian botanists
University of Oslo alumni
Academic staff of the University of Oslo
Members of the Norwegian Academy of Science and Letters
Socialist Left Party (Norway) politicians
People from Bærum